Flavokavain C is a flavokavain found in the kava plant.

See also
Kavalactone

References

Kava
Phenol ethers